The Raphael Hotel is a historic nine-story hotel located at 325 Ward Parkway in the Country Club Plaza district in Kansas City, Missouri. It is a locally significant landmark that originally opened in 1928 as Villa Serena Apartments, a block of luxury apartments. Its Italian Renaissance Revival style architecture was designed to complement the Spanish style of the nascent Country Club Plaza developed in the early 1920s. 

IN 1974, the J.C. Nichols Company purchased the structure, remodeled and re-opened it as The Raphael in 1975. The 126-room hotel is patterned after small European hotels. The property is a member of the Historic Hotels of America since 2001 and was listed in the National Register of Historic Places in 2009. Raphael Hotel is affiliated with the Marriott Autograph Collection. As of 2017, Raphael hotel had a restaurant named Chaz.

References

Bibliography

External links 
 Official website

1928 establishments in Missouri
Hotel buildings on the National Register of Historic Places in Missouri
National Register of Historic Places in Kansas City, Missouri
Historic Hotels of America
Hotel buildings completed in 1928
Renaissance Revival architecture in Missouri